Caroline Achaintre (born December 1969) is a mixed media artist living and working in London. Her work draws heavily on Animism , Expressionism , Theatricality and the Handmade .

Born in Toulouse and brought up near Nuremberg, Achaintre obtained a scholarship at the Kunsthochschule in Halle, then came to London to study at the Chelsea College of Arts and then at Goldsmiths, University of London before establishing a studio in Homerton, East London.

Much of her earlier work was in textiles, particularly wool, and Primitivist in style, though she has also worked in installation, and also in ink on paper and ceramics. Much of this work draws on traditions of carnival and tribal masks and the potential to both attract and repulse through the materials. She has held a number of residencies and exhibited in a number of locations, including London's Saatchi Gallery, Cell Project Space (London), Birmingham's Eastside Projects, and as part of the eighth British Art Show.

References

1969 births
Living people

Alumni of Goldsmiths, University of London
Artists from London
British contemporary artists
Artists from Nuremberg
Textile artists